Lucky Ruby Border Casino founded by Mr. Jment Lim. The casino is located in Cambodia's Prey Vor, Kampong Rou District, Svay Rieng Province, which is about three and a half hours away from Phnom Penh, an hour from Bavet and three hours from Ho Chi Minh City, Vietnam.

Currently, the Lucky Ruby Border Casino has a total of 63 hotels rooms and more will be built in line with their expansion. The Border Casino has various facilities that will fulfill any travelers needs from relaxation to entertainment via the various facilities that they have prepared on ground. The Lucky Ruby Border Casino is a legally licensed establishment which includes all the facilities on their grounds.

The Lucky Ruby Border Casino is the first in the world to implement the Bai Buu Jackpot.

Casino games 
 Baccarat 
 Dragon Tiger
 Bai Buu
 Fan Tan
 Dragon Tiger
 3 Card Poker
 Niu Niu

Facilities 
 Skybar
 Asian Beer Garden
 Karaoke (KTV)
 Ruby Mart
 Ruby Cafe
 Disco
 Sauna & Jacuzzi
 Massage
 Gym

Social Responsibility 
Lucky Ruby Border Casino is seen to be involved in a lot of social responsibility as well as activities to build up with local socio economic quality in the area. This can be seen through an analysis of their activities.
 Yearly donations to the needy within society
 Construction of new Buddhist school
 Donations for students and re-building of school
 Bridge construction
 Donation of school supplier and computers
 Refurbishment of roads that are damaged
 Donation of items to flood victims
 Contribution to the Covid-19 vaccine fund

References

Casinos in Cambodia
Casinos completed in 2015
Hotels in Cambodia
Casino hotels
2015 establishments in Cambodia